The Rue d'Astorg is a street in the 8th arrondissement of Paris, France. It was built in 1774 on land formerly owned by Louis d'Astorg d'Aubarède, Marquess of Roquépine.

References

1774 establishments in France